Charles Freeman may refer to:

 Charles Freeman (American Giant) (1821–1845)
 Charles Freeman (historian), English author and historian
 Charles E. Freeman (1933–2020), American jurist
 Charles F. Freeman (1832–1915), American businessman and politician
 Charles L. Freeman (1908–2001), American film and sound editor
 Charles W. Freeman Jr. (born 1943), American diplomat
 Charlie Freeman (1887–1956), English footballer